TopoQuest is a free web mapping service built on open source software that provides internet-based topographic maps for most of the United States.

The site is one of three internet services used by Wikipedia for providing topographic maps.  It arose to prominence in May 2008 after TopoZone through its new trails.com owners required payment for access to its maps.  TopoQuest map links are the same as  Topozone's except for the difference in the domain.

It is operated by Ryan Niemi in Klamath Falls, Oregon.

History
Niemi first experimented with a mapping program in July 2001 as a Linux, PHP and MySQL alternative to Microsoft's TerraServer-USA topographic mapviewer.

The domain was registered at Go Daddy to Sunset Dynamics on August 10, 2004.

However Niemi did not aggressively develop the website because of the success of Topozone.

After Topozone started the for pay business model on April 8, 2008, Niemi made updates to get the website to match the Topozone URL methodology for viewing 1:24K USGS Digital raster graphic maps available from the Libre Map Project and Internet Archive and was operating by May 2008.

Code was adapted from the MapServer project at the University of Minnesota.  The viewer was made seamless by incorporating GDAL.

In addition to matching the Topozone URL's, the website offers free download of GeoTIFFs, which Topozone had only offered for a premium.

TopoQuest started adding Canadian 1:50K scale topographic maps in July 2008, and USGS 1:100K and 1:250K scale topographic maps in March 2009.

References

External links
topoquest.com

Topography techniques
Web Map Services
Map companies of the United States
Maps of Canada
Maps of the United States
Companies based in Oregon
Klamath Falls, Oregon
2008 establishments in Oregon